Zaragozic acids are a family of natural products produced by fungi. The first characterized zaragozic acids, A, B, and C were isolated from an unidentified sterile fungal culture, Sporormiella intermedia, and L. elatius, respectively. just outside the European city Zaragoza, Spain on the Jalón river. This family of natural products possesses a unique 4,8-dioxabicyclo[3.2.1]octane core, and vary in their 1-alkyl and their 6-acyl side chains.

Uses
Zaragozic acids are potent inhibitors of S. cervisiae, fungal and mammalian squalene synthase and therefore inhibitors of sterol synthesis. Squalene synthase is the first committed enzyme in sterol synthesis, catalyzing the reductive condensation of farnesyl pyrophosphate to form squalene. As a squalene synthase inhibitor, zaragozic acid produces lower plasma cholesterol levels in primates. Treatment of rats with zaragozic acid A caused an increase in hepatic low density lipoprotein (LDL) receptor mRNA levels.

Zaragozic acids also mildly inhibit Ras farnesyl-protein transferase.

Zaragozic acid D and D2 have been isolated from the keratinophilic fungus Amauroascus niger.

Biosynthesis 
The core biosynthetic route is via a polyketide synthase pathway from 10 acetates,
4 methyls of methionines, 1 succinate, and 1 benzoic acid.

References 

Tricarboxylic acids
Vinylidene compounds